Stormont, Dundas and Glengarry Highlanders is a Primary Reserve infantry regiment of the Canadian Army. It is part of 33 Canadian Brigade Group, 4th Canadian Division and is headquartered in Cornwall, Ontario.

Regimental badge
Superimposed upon a background of thistle, leaves and flowers the letters SDG; below, a raven on a rock superimposed on a maple leaf. A half scroll to the left of  the maple leaf is inscribed  DILEAS; another to the right inscribed GU BAS;
above, a semi-annulus inscribed GLENGARRY FENCIBLES and surmounted by the Crown. The whole superimposed upon a Saint Andrew’s cross,

Lineage
The Stormont, Dundas and Glengarry Highlanders was raised in Cornwall, Ontario, on 3 July 1868, as the 59th "Stormont and Glengarry" Battalion of Infantry. It was redesignated as the 59th "Stormont" Battalion of Infantry on 22 June 1883; as the 59th Stormont and Glengarry Battalion of Infantry on 23 March 1888; and as the 59th Stormont and Glengarry Regiment on 8 May 1900. Following the Great War it was redesignated as The Stormont and Glengarry Regiment on 12 March 1920; as The Stormont, Dundas and Glengarry Highlanders on 15 February 1922; as the 2nd (Reserve) Battalion, The Stormont, Dundas and Glengarry Highlanders on 7 November 1940; as The Stormont, Dundas and Glengarry Highlanders on 24 May 1946; and as The Stormont, Dundas and Glengarry Highlanders (Machine Gun) on 1 September 1954 before returning to its designation as the Stormont, Dundas and Glengarry Highlanders on 1 August 1959.

Lineage chart

Perpetuations

War of 1812
1st Regiment of Dundas Militia
1st Regiment of Glengarry Militia
2nd Regiment of Glengarry Militia
1st Regiment of Prescott Militia
1st Regiment of Stormont Militia
Glengarry Light Infantry

Great War
154th Battalion (Stormont-Dundas-Glengarry), CEF

Operational history

Fenian Raids
In 1866, the various companies in the counties were called out for service along the St Lawrence River frontier, serving at Prescott and Cornwall. The 59th Stormont and Glengarry Battalion was again called out on active service on 24 May 1870. It served on the St. Lawrence River frontier at Prescott and Cornwall until it was removed from active service on 1 June 1870.

Great War
Details of the 59th Stormont and Glengarry Regiment were placed on active service on 6 August 1914 for local protection duties.

The 154th (Stormont-Dundas-Glengarry) Battalion, CEF was authorized on 22 December 1915 and embarked for Great Britain on 25 October 1916 where it provided reinforcements for the Canadian Corps in the field until 31 January 1917, when its personnel were absorbed by the '6th Reserve Battalion, CEF'. The battalion was subsequently disbanded on 17 July 1917.

Second World War
Details from the regiment were called out on service on 26 August 1939 and then placed on active service on 1 September 1939, as The  Stormont, Dundas and Glengarry Highlanders, CASF (Details), for local protection duties. Those details called out on active service were disbanded on 31 December 1940.

The regiment mobilized The Stormont, Dundas and Glengarry Highlanders, CASF for active service on 24 May 1940. It was redesignated as the 1st Battalion, The Stormont, Dundas and Glengarry Highlanders, CASF on 7 November 1940. The unit 
embarked for Great Britain on 19 July 1941. On D-Day, 6 June 1944, it landed in Normandy, France, as part of the 9th Infantry Brigade, 3rd Canadian Infantry Division, and it continued to fight in North West Europe until the end of the war. The overseas battalion was disbanded on 15 January 1946.

The regiment mobilized the 3rd Battalion, The Stormont, Dundas and Glengarry Highlanders, CIC, CAOF on 1 June 1945 for service with the Canadian Army Occupation Force in Germany. This battalion was disbanded on 24 May 1946.

Conflict in Afghanistan
The regiment contributed an aggregate of more than 20% of its authorized strength to the various Task Forces which served in Afghanistan between 2002 and 2014.

History
After the surrender at Yorktown, veterans of the King's Royal Regiment of New York and the 84th Regiment of Foot (Royal Highland Emigrants), were given land on the north bank of the Saint Lawrence River so they could defend Upper Canada from the new enemy to the south. In 1804, veterans of the Glengarry Fencibles, a Highland regiment that served in Europe with the British Army, settled just north of the American Revolutionary War veterans. The first militia unit west of Montreal was organized at Cornwall in 1787 under the command of Major John Macdonnell, late of the K.R.R.N.Y.

War of 1812
When the War of 1812 broke out in June 1812, the Militiamen from the area gathered to prevent an invasion of their homeland and the companies were formed into the various county militias. These regiments fought throughout the war, with many men from the regiments being transferred to the Incorporated Battalion of Canadian Militia fighting in the Niagara Peninsula at the Battle of Lundy's Lane.

The principle engagements of the militias of Stormont, Dundas, and Glengarry were:

Battle of Matilda – On September 16, 1812, soldiers from the 1st Dundas Militia under Captain Ault and the Royal Newfoundland Regiment were escorting a shipment of supplies from Montreal to Kingston when they were attacked near Matilda by 500 American Militia who were hiding on Toussaint Island. The Dundas militia landed on Presqu'ile Island just as an American force landed on the same and an exchange of fire occurred. The Americans were driven back and retreated to Toussaint's Island, and soon more Dundas men arrived on Presqu'ile in case of a second invasion. Col. MacDonell in command of the Dundas Militia, along with Capt. Shaver and Capt. Ault were joined by Grenville and Prescott Militia and a 9-pounder artillery piece from Prescott that had originally been captured during the Battle of the Thousand Islands. After a few rounds of fire from the cannon and muskets, the Americans abandoned the island and retreated across the border. Canadian losses were one killed and several wounded.

First Battle of Ogdensburg – The Dundas and Stormont Militias next fought at the First Battle of Ogdensburg on October 4, 1812, launching an amphibious raid from Prescott to gather supplies but being turned back by American artillery and militia.

Battle of French Mills – New York State Militia captured the British post at Akwesasne, an Indian community that straddled the St. Lawrence River in a location where the present-day borders of Ontario, Quebec and New York State intersect. It, and the nearby American post at French Mills on the Salmon River, were recaptured on November 23, 1812, by a British Canadian force, including the Dundas and Stormont Militias, carrying supplies up the St. Lawrence River.

Battle of Ogdensburg – On February 22, 1813, a British Canadian force including Dundas Militia, Stormont Militia, and Prescott Militia crossed the frozen St Lawrence River and charged the American fort at Ogdensburg. The Americans fought back but were eventually forced to retreat and the British and Canadians captured the town, burning the boats and taking the artillery and military supplies back to Prescott.

Battle of Hoople's Creek - American forces under General James Wilkinson crossed the St Lawrence River and hoped to march on Montreal, but the local British and Canadian forces engaged them before they could move past Dundas County. On November 10, a force of Glengarry and Stormont Militia engaged the Americans at the Battle of Hoople's Creek, delaying them long enough to evacuate the civilians and military supplies from the area.

Battle of Crysler's Farm – On November 11, the Dundas, Stormont, Prescott, and Glengarry Militias along with the 49th Regiment of Foot and the 89th Regiment of Foot engaged the main American force at John Crysler's farm in Williamsburg township. John Crysler was now Lt. Col. in command of the Dundas Militia and led that regiment bravely, repelling the Americans and forcing them back into New York.

Salmon River Raid – In February 1814, the American forces near French Mills began leaving their supply depots and garrisons for Plattsburgh and Sackett's Harbor. On the 19th, a British Canadian force including the Dundas and Stormont Militias crossed to the Salmon River, setting fire to the abandoned boats and barracks of the Americans, capturing considerable amounts of ammunition and supplies to bring back to Dundas.

For a long time, breaks in unit continuity with the pre-Confederation period denied the regiment the "Niagara" battle honour and the status of oldest anglophone militia regiment in Canada. However, on the occasion of the bicentennial of the War of 1812 in 2012, the Government of Canada permitted Canadian regiments to perpetuate and officially commemorate 1812 militia and Fencible units thus awarding the Stormont, Dundas and Glengarry Highlanders three War of 1812 battle honours, including the battle honour NIAGARA which had been awarded to the Glengarry Light Infantry Fencibles.

After 1814, and Stormont and Dundas counties soon had two militia regiments each and Glengarry County had four.

Rebellions of 1837–1838
All units fought the rebels of 1837–1838, two in Lower Canada and three at the 1838 Battle of the Windmill, where 10 militiamen were killed and 13 wounded.

Fenian Raids
The 1855 Militia Act introduced voluntary service, and the United Counties raised many independent companies in 1862 following the Trent Affair. In 1866, the various companies in the counties were called out for service along the St Lawrence River frontier, serving at Prescott and Cornwall. An attack on Prescott and subsequent advance to Ottawa was prevented by the presence of a considerable force of volunteers from Dundas, Stormont, and Glengarry, and a British gunboat on the river. The Fenians then moved eastward to Malone and vicinity, and an attack on Cornwall was expected, but the presence of three thousand troops there again dissuaded them from attacking.

Some of the local regiments raised during the 1860s for service on the border were:

Cornwall Mounted Patrol - volunteer mounted infantry company
59th Cornwall Battalion - would become the 59th Stormont and Glengarry Battalion
Cornwall Infantry and Rifles  - volunteer infantry company with whom James Pliny Whitney served
Morrisburg Garrison Artillery - volunteer artillery company

After the 1866 invasion, these companies and four others amalgamated in 1868 to form the 59th Stormont and Glengarry Battalion and was again called out on active service on 24 May 1870. It served on the St. Lawrence River frontier at Prescott and Cornwall until it was removed from active service on 1 June 1870.

Nine Stormont and Glengarry men served in the Second Boer War.

Great War
At the outbreak of the Great War, the Regiment – in Highland dress  since 1904 – guarded the St. Lawrence canals until December 1915, when the United Counties raised the 154th Battalion for the Canadian Expeditionary Force.

The 154th  Battalion went overseas but was broken up to  reinforce the "Iron Second," the 21st and 38th Battalions and the 4th Canadian Mounted Rifles. Of the 154th Battalion soldiers, 143 were killed and 397 wounded;  their efforts are commemorated in 24 decorations and six battle honours.

More than 100 members of the 59th Stormont and Glengarry Regiment were killed  while serving with the CEF, including Claude Joseph Patrick Nunney, who won the Victoria Cross in 1918. Nunney joined the 59th in 1913 and enlisted in the 38th Battalion, which is perpetuated by The Cameron Highlanders of Ottawa (Duke of Edinburgh's Own), so the Camerons correctly claim him; however, his medals hang today in the Warrant Officers' and Sergeants' Mess of the SD&G Highlanders.

Second World War
When the Second World War began, the Regiment once again guarded the St. Lawrence canals. Mobilization came in June 1940, and the Regiment absorbed companies from the Princess of Wales' Own Regiment and the Brockville Rifles to form an overseas battalion that went to England in 1941 as part of the 9th (Highland) Brigade, 3rd Canadian Infantry Division.

The SD&G Highlanders landed in Normandy on D Day and was the first regiment to enter Caen, reaching the centre of the city at 1300 hours, July 9, 1944.

Fifty-five days later, 112 SD&G Highlanders had been killed in action and 312 more wounded in the Falaise Gap. The Regiment fought across France via Rouen, Eu, Le Hamel and Boulogne, moved into the Netherlands and took part in the amphibious landing across the Savojaardsplaat, and advanced to Knokke by way of Breskens. It moved next to Nijmegen to relieve the airborne troops, and helped guard the bridge while the Rhine crossing was prepared. The Regiment then fought through the Hochwald and north to cross the Ems-River and take the city of Leer.

At dawn on May 3, 1945, German marine-units launched an attack on two forward companies of the SD&G Highlanders, occupying the village of Rorichum, near Oldersum, that was the final action during the war, VE Day found the SD&G Highlanders near Emden.

It was said of the Regiment that it "never failed to take an objective; never lost a yard of ground; never lost a man taken prisoner in offensive action."

Altogether 3,342 officers and men served overseas with the SD&G Highlanders, of whom 278 were killed and 781 wounded; 74 decorations and 25 battle honours were awarded. A total of 3,418 officers and men served in the 2nd Battalion (Reserve); of them, 1,882 went on active service and 27 were killed. A third battalion raised in July 1945 served in the occupation of Germany and was disbanded in May 1946.

Post war
In 1968, to mark the regiment's centenary, the Stormont, Dundas and Glengarry Highlanders received the Freedom
of the City of Cornwall.

Conflict in Afghanistan
The regiment contributed an aggregate of more than 20% of its authorized strength to the various Task Forces which served in Afghanistan between 2002 and 2014. Cpl Eric Monnin was awarded the Medal of Military Valour for his actions on 9 July 2010 in Kandahar Province, Afghanistan while serving with the 1st Battalion, The Royal Canadian Regiment.

Battle honours
In the list below, battle honours in capitals were awarded for participation in large operations and campaigns, while those in lowercase indicate honours granted for more specific battles. Those battle honours in bold type are emblazoned on the regimental colour.

War of 1812

Great War

Second World War

Conflict in Afghanistan

Regimental headquarters
Cornwall Armoury; 505 Fourth Street East,
Cornwall, Ontario K6H 2J7

Coordinates:

Armoury

Regimental museum 

The museum collects, preserves and exhibits military artifacts and archival material related to the Regiment and its predecessor units in the three counties of Stormont, Dundas and Glengarry as well as material related to the military experiences of the residents of the three counties.

Tartan
Macdonell of Glengarry

Monuments, plaques, badges, honour rolls

Glengarry Fencibles
Provincial Plaque at Cornwall Armoury
154th Battalion
Plaque and Honour Roll at Cornwall Armoury
Monument in Alexandria, Glengarry County
1st Battalion
Plaque and Honour Roll at Cornwall Armoury
Honour Roll at Brockville Armoury
Plaque and Honour Roll at Royal Canadian Legion Number 9, Kingston
Badge at Memorial Centre, Peterborough
Badge on D-Day tank "Bold" at Courseulles, France
Plaque and Badge on Chateau de Paix de Coeur and
Monument at "Rue des Glengarrians", Les Buissons, France
Memorial Tablet at Abbaye d’Ardenne
Monument, Badge and Plaque at Avenue President, Coty and Rue d’Authie, Caen, France
Mannequin at Bayeux Memorial Museum of The Battle of Normandy, France
Monument at "Place du Glens" at Urville, France
Plaque at Le Mairie
Plaque in the Hotel de Ville, Rouen, France
Plaque and Badge in the Citadel, Boulonge, France
Badge on Belgian Resistance Monument, Knokke/Heist, Belgium
Plaque at Town Hall, Breskens, Netherlands
Plaque at Town Hall, Hoofdplaat, Netherlands

The 59th Battalion Colours are laid up in the Officers' Mess and the 154th Battalion Colours are laid up in the Trinity Anglican Church, Second Street, Cornwall, Ontario.

Media
 Up the Glens: Stormont, Dundas and Glengarry Highlanders, 1783–1994 by W ; Patterson, W J Boss (1995)
 The Stormont, Dundas and Glengarry Highlanders 1783–1951 by Lieut.-Colonel W., C.D. Boss (1952)

See also

 Canadian-Scottish regiment
 List of armouries in Canada
 Military history of Canada
 History of the Canadian Army
 Canadian Forces
 Paul Yakabuski

Notes

References

 Barnes, RM, The Uniforms and History of the Scottish Regiments, London, Sphere Books Limited, 1972.

Across the Start Line.. 33 Canadian Brigade Group

Order of precedence

Stormont, Dundas and Glengarry Highlanders
Highland & Scottish regiments of Canada
Military units and formations of Ontario
Infantry regiments of Canada in World War II
Organizations based in Ontario
Cornwall, Ontario
Military units and formations established in 1868